Limni ( meaning "lake") is a town and a community in the northwestern part of the island of Euboea, Greece. It is located northwest of Chalkida and southeast of Istiaia. Limni is part of the municipal unit of Elymnioi, and it was the seat of the municipality Elymnioi. The community Limni had a population of 2,046 in 2011. It is built at the foot of a mountain slope, on a bay of the North Euboean Gulf. It has been suggested as the site of the ancient city of Elymnion.

Subdivisions

The community Limni consists of the following settlements:
Limni
Chronia
Katounia
Myrtias
Retsinolakkos
Sipias

Population

People
Limni was the home of the independence fighter Angelis Govios, Greek resistance activist Lela Karagianni and the film director and screenwriter Nikos Tsiforos. In 1959 the English writer Philip Sherrard bought part of disused magnesite mine near Limni, planted trees and plants where the former mine installations had been, and restored the abandoned homes of the former directors who had lived there before the Second World War. From 1977 until his death in 1995 it was his permanent home.  Greek-American real estate magnate George M. Marcus was born in Limni in 1941.

See also
List of settlements in the Euboea regional unit

References

External links
 Limni on GTP Travel Pages

Populated places in Euboea